The Killing Game is a 1967 French comedy film directed by Alain Jessua. It was entered into the 1967 Cannes Film Festival where it won the award for Best Screenplay.

Cast
 Jean-Pierre Cassel as Pierre Meyrand
 Claudine Auger as Jacqueline Meyrand
 Michel Duchaussoy as Bob Neuman
 Eléonore Hirt as Geneviève Neuman
 Guy Saint-Jean as Ado
 Anna Gaylor as Lisbeth
 Nancy Holloway as Brigitte

References

External links

1967 films
1960s French-language films
1967 comedy films
Films about comics
Films about fictional painters
Films directed by Alain Jessua
French comedy films
1960s French films